Stanley Creek is a stream in the U.S. state of Georgia. It is a tributary to the Toccoa River.

Stanley Creek was named after John Stanley, a pioneer citizen.

References

Rivers of Georgia (U.S. state)
Rivers of Fannin County, Georgia
Rivers of Gilmer County, Georgia